On June 18, 2001, a small, but fatal tornado outbreak occurred across the Upper Midwest as well as Florida. The outbreak spawned a long-tracked F3 tornado that killed three people, and caused approximately US$10 million in damage. The tornado struck Siren, Wisconsin, a small village whose only siren was malfunctioning when the tornado moved through. Other less damaging tornadoes were confirmed in Florida, Iowa, Minnesota and Nebraska. Following the outbreak, areas affected by the Wisconsin tornado received financial assistance from local and federal authorities.

Meteorological synopsis
After a brief F0 tornado touched down in Florida, meteorological conditions during the evening hours of June 18, 2001 rapidly began to deteriorate across the Upper Midwest. At 7 PM CDT (0000 UTC) an occluding cyclone was present over Northeast Minnesota, while a secondary front was located to its south. A zonally oriented warm front extended from the southern low, while a north-south cold front was located near the low pressure. Cape values in Iowa were between the 3000 to 4500 J/kg range, and conditions were starting to deteriorate there as well. By early evening a line of thunderstorms began to develop along the cold front across Eastern Nebraska and Iowa, and extended up into Minnesota. The first tornado of the outbreak happened at 7:22 PM CDT (0022) near the town of Day, Minnesota. At 7:36 PM CDT (0036 UTC) the second tornado of the outbreak, an F0, made a brief touchdown near Tekamah, Nebraska. Some of the Iowa storms also rapidly developed into severe thunderstorms. At 7:59 PM CDT (0059 UTC) Harrison County fire and rescue reported that a tornado had touchdown near Modale. The F0 was on the ground only briefly before lifting. In Wisconsin, convection with was firing up near the Minnesota state border, and an "Enhanced-V" signature became evident on one cell. At 8:06 PM CDT (0106 UTC) an F3 touched down East-Northeast of Grantsburg. The tornado continued in an eastward direction moving through the towns of Alpha, Falun and Siren. The tornado moved into Washburn County, where it eventually dissipated near Spooner. The last tornado of the outbreak occurred near Glidden, Iowa. It was rated an F0. Many other storms also caused hail and wind reports across the Midwest, in association with this outbreak.

Confirmed tornadoes

June 18 event

Alpha–Siren–Hertel, Wisconsin

The Siren tornado was the outbreak's only fatal storm, killing two people and injuring another 16. Damage from the tornado was estimated at approximately US$10 million. The tornado caused the most damage in the village of Siren, where most structures were completely destroyed. 240 buildings were damaged or destroyed by the tornado, and over 100 firefighters helped rescue people trapped in buildings and clean up. Residents reported cows and other livestock flying through the air during the tornado. Despite a tornado warning being issued, Siren's only civil defense siren failed as a result of a lightning strike in April or May. Police took to the streets, sounding their horns and shouting warnings to local residents. The siren system had been scheduled to be repaired the following week.

Aftermath
Following the Siren tornado, Wisconsin Governor Scott McCallum declared a state of emergency. Milwaukee's American Signal Corporation donated a T-121 siren to the village. The village of Siren received a state grant of $500,000; Burnett and Washburn counties received $250,000 from the United States Department of Labor to help rebuild.

See also
List of North American tornadoes and tornado outbreaks
1996 Oakfield tornado outbreak

Notes

References

External links
NWS Duluth Event Report

Tornadoes of 2001
Tornadoes in Wisconsin
F3 tornadoes
Tornadoes in Iowa
Tornadoes in Nebraska
Tornadoes in Minnesota
June 2001 events in the United States